New Caledonia is a major source for nickel and contains roughly 10% of the world's known nickel supply. The islands contain about 7,100,000 tonnes of nickel. With the annual production of about 107,000 tonnes in 2009, New Caledonia was the world's fifth largest producer after Russia (266,000), Indonesia (189,000), Canada (181,000) and Australia (167,000). In recent years, the economy has suffered because of depressed international demand for nickel due to the 2007-2008 global financial crisis. Only a negligible amount of the land is suitable for cultivation, and food accounts for about 20% of imports. In addition to nickel, the substantial financial support from France and tourism are keys to the health of the economy. In the 2000s, large additions were made to nickel mining capacity. The Goro Nickel Plant is expected to be one of the largest nickel producing plants on Earth. This plant produces an estimated 20% of the global nickel supply. However, the need to respond to environmental concerns over the country's globally recognized ecological heritage, may increasingly need to be factored into capitalization of mining operations.

The GDP of New Caledonia in 2007 was 8.8 billion US dollars at market exchange rates, the fourth-largest economy in Oceania after Australia, New Zealand, and Hawaii. The GDP per capita was 36,376 US dollars in 2007 (at market exchange rates, not at PPP), lower than in Australia and Hawaii, but higher than in New Zealand.

In 2007, exports from New Caledonia amounted to 2.11 billion US dollars, 96.3% of which were mineral products and alloys (essentially nickel ore and ferronickel). Imports amounted to 2.88 billion US dollars. 26.6% of imports came from Metropolitan France, 16.1% from other European countries, 13.6% from Singapore (mostly fuel), 10.7% from Australia, 4.0% from New Zealand, 3.2% from the United States, 3.0% from China, 3.0% from Japan, and 22.7% from other countries.

Tourism 

As of 2007, about 200 Japanese couples travel to New Caledonia each year for their wedding and honeymoon. Oceania Flash reported in 2007 that one company planned to build a new wedding chapel to accommodate Japanese weddings to supplement the Le Meridien Resort in Nouméa.

New Caledonia is a popular destination for Australian high school students who are studying French.

See also 

 Economy of France in: French Guiana, French Polynesia, Guadeloupe, Martinique, Mayotte, New Caledonia, Réunion, Saint Barthélemy, Saint Martin, Saint Pierre and Miquelon, Wallis and Futuna
 Taxation in France
 Economic history of France
 Poverty in France

References